Kalisto may refer to:
 Kalisto (wrestler), the ring name of professional wrestler Emmanuel Alejandro Rodriguez
 Kalisto (warez group), a console warez group for PlayStation games
 Kalisto Entertainment, a defunct French video game development company

See also 
 Kallisto (disambiguation)
 Calisto (disambiguation)
 Callisto (disambiguation)